Jacksonville is an unincorporated community in Adams County, in the U.S. state of Ohio.

History
Jacksonville was laid out in 1815, and named for Andrew Jackson (1767–1845), an officer in the War of 1812 and afterward seventh President of the United States. A post office was established as Jacksonville in 1820, the name was changed to Dunbarton in 1827, and the post office closed in 1909.

References

Unincorporated communities in Adams County, Ohio
1815 establishments in Ohio
Populated places established in 1815
Unincorporated communities in Ohio